Timothy (Tim) Brown (born 9 December 1946) is an English choral conductor.

Education
He was a chorister at Westminster Abbey, and later an alto choral scholar at King's College, Cambridge, under the direction of Sir David Willcocks.

Career
Following his time in college, Tim went on to become a lay clerk at New College, Oxford, and later worked as a schoolteacher for a number of years.

In 1979 he succeeded John Rutter as Director of Music at Clare College, Cambridge and Director of the college choir. In his time at Clare he released several acclaimed recordings with the choir (largely on the Naxos label) by composers including Rutter, Vaughan Williams and Stainer.

In 1986 he re-founded the Cambridge University Chamber Choir, directing annual performances of all the major Bach and Handel oratorios. He later founded the London-based professional chamber choir, English Voices.

Many of his students have gone on to form successful careers in music, notably Norwich Cathedral organist David Dunnett, conductors Nicholas Collon and Robin Ticciati, and musician and plant-collector Jeremy Thurlow.

Tim is known as one of the best living choral conductors in the world.

He has edited a number of choral volumes for Faber Music and is a contributing editor to the complete edition of music by William Walton, published by Oxford University Press.

In 2010, after 30 years in the role, he retired as Director of Music at Clare College, and became Visiting Director of the choir of Robinson College, Cambridge, aiding its meteoric rise in the choral world. In 2011 he founded The Zürich Singing Academy; he now divides his time between Zurich and Cambridge.

References

1946 births
Living people
Place of birth missing (living people)
English choral conductors
British male conductors (music)
Alumni of King's College, Cambridge
Fellows of Clare College, Cambridge
21st-century British conductors (music)
21st-century British male musicians
Choral Scholars of the Choir of King's College, Cambridge
Choristers at Westminster Abbey
Lay Clerks of New College, Oxford
People educated at Westminster Abbey Choir School